A melt inclusion is a small parcel or "blobs" of melt(s) that is entrapped by crystals growing in magma and eventually forming igneous rocks. In many respects it is analogous to a fluid inclusion within magmatic hydrothermal systems. Melt inclusions tend to be microscopic in size and can be analyzed for volatile contents that are used to interpret trapping pressures of the melt at depth.

Characteristics
Melt inclusions are generally small - most are less than 80 micrometres across (a micrometre is one thousandth of a millimeter, or about 0.00004 inches). They may contain a number of different constituents, including glass (which represents melt that has been quenched by rapid cooling), small crystals and a separate vapour-rich bubble. They occur in the crystals that can be found in igneous rocks, such as for example quartz, feldspar, olivine, pyroxene, nepheline, magnetite, perovskite and apatite. Melt inclusions can be found in both volcanic and plutonic rocks. In addition, melt inclusions can contain immiscible (non-miscible) melt phases and their study is an exceptional way to find direct evidence for presence of two or more melts at entrapment.

Analysis
Although they are small, melt inclusions can provide an abundance of useful information. Using microscopic observations and a range of chemical microanalysis techniques geochemists and igneous petrologists can obtain a range of unique information from melt inclusions.  There are various techniques used in analyzing melt inclusion H2O and CO2 contents, major, minor and trace elements including double-sided FTIR micro transmittance, single-sided FTIR micro reflectance, Raman spectroscopy, microthermometry, Secondary Ion Mass Spectroscopy (SIMS), Laser Ablation-Inductively Coupled Plasma Mass Spectrometry (LA-ICPMS), Scanning Electron Microscopy (SEM) and electron microprobe analysis (EMPA). If there is a vapor bubble present within the melt inclusion, analysis of the vapor bubble must be taken into consideration when reconstructing the total volatile budget of the melt inclusion.

Microthermometry 
Microthermometry is the process of reheating a melt inclusion to its original melt temperature and then rapidly quenching to form a homogenous glass phase free of daughter minerals or vapor bubbles that may have been originally contained within the melt inclusion.

Microscope-mounted high temperature stage heating 
Stage heating is the process of heating a melt inclusion on a microscope-mounted stage and flowing either helium gas (Vernadsky stage) or argon gas (Linkam TS1400XY) over the stage and then rapidly quenching the melt inclusion after it has reached its original melt temperature to form a homogenous glass phase. Use of a heating stage allows for observation of changing phases of the melt inclusion as it is reheated to its original melt temperature.

One atmosphere vertical furnaces 
This process allows for reheating of one or more melt inclusions in a furnace held at a constant pressure of one atmosphere to their original melt temperatures and then rapidly quenching in water to produce a homogenous glass phase.

Fourier transform infrared spectroscopy (FTIR) 
This analytical method requires the use of an infrared laser focused on a spot on the glass phase of the melt inclusion to determine an absorption (or extinction) coefficient for either H2O and CO2 associated with wavelengths for each species depending on the parent lithology that contained the melt inclusion.

Raman spectroscopy 
This analysis is similar to FTIR in using a focused laser on the glass phase of the melt inclusion or a vapor bubble that may be contained in the melt inclusion to identify wavelengths associated with the Raman vibrating bands of volatiles, such as H2O and CO2. Raman spectroscopy can also be used to determine the density of CO2 contained in a vapor bubble if present at a high enough concentration within a melt inclusion.

Secondary Ion Mass Spectrometry (SIMS) 
This analytical technique is used to determine volatile as well as trace element concentrations by aiming an ion beam (16O− or 133Cs+) at the melt inclusion to produce secondary ions that can be measured by a mass spectrometer.

Laser Ablation-Inductively Coupled Plasma Mass Spectrometry (LA-ICPMS) 
This analytical technique can determine major and trace elements, however, with LA-ICPMS, the melt inclusion and any accompanying materials within the melt inclusion are ionized, thus destroying the melt inclusion, and then analyzed with a mass spectrometer.

Scanning Electron Microscopy (SEM) 
Scanning electron microscopy is a useful tool to employ before any of the above analyses that may result in loss of the original material since it can be used to check for daughter minerals or vapor bubbles and help determine the best technique that should be chosen for melt inclusion analysis.

Electron Microprobe Analysis (EPMA) 
Electron microprobe analysis is ubiquitous in the analysis of major and minor elements in melt inclusions and provide oxide concentrations used in determining parental magma types of the melt inclusions and phenocryst hosts.

Vapor Bubbles 

The presence of a vapor bubble adds an additional component for analysis given that the vapor bubble could contain a significant proportion of the H2O and CO2 originally in the melt sampled by the melt inclusion. If the vapor bubble is composed primarily of CO2, Raman spectroscopy can be used to determine the density of CO2 present.

Interpretation

Volatile Concentrations 
Melt inclusions can be used to determine the composition, compositional evolution and volatile components of magmas that existed in the history of magma systems. This is because melt inclusions act as a tiny pressure vessel that isolates and preserves the ambient melt surrounding the crystal before they are modified by later processes, such as post-entrapment crystallization. Given that melt inclusions form at varying pressures (P) and temperatures (T), they can also provide important information about the entrapping conditions (P-T) at depth and their volatile contents (H2O, CO2, S, Cl and F) that drive volcanic eruptions.

Major, minor and trace element concentrations 
Major and minor element concentrations are generally determined using EPMA and common element compositions include Si, Ti, Al, Cr, Fe, Mn, Mg, Ca, Ni, Na, K, P, Cl, F and S. Knowledge of the oxide concentrations related to these major and minor elements can help to determine the composition of the parental magma, the melt inclusion and the phenocryst hosts.

Trace element concentrations can be measured by SIMS analysis with resolution in some cases as low as 1 ppm. LA-ICPMS analyses can also be used to determine trace element concentrations, however lower resolution compared to SIMS does not provide determination of concentrations as low as 1 ppm.

History
Henry Clifton Sorby, in 1858, was the first to document microscopic melt inclusions in crystals. The study of melt inclusions has been driven more recently by the development of sophisticated chemical analysis techniques. Scientists from the former Soviet Union lead the study of melt inclusions in the decades after World War II, and developed methods for heating melt inclusions under a microscope, so changes could be directly observed. A.T. Anderson explored analysis of melt inclusions from basaltic magmas from Kilauea Volcano in Hawaii to determine initial volatile concentrations of magma at depth.

See also
Inclusion (mineral)
Fluid Inclusion

References

Further reading

External links
The melt inclusion page (Jake Lowenstern, USGS)
Fluid and melt inclusions (Phil Brown, University of Wisconsin–Madison)

Igneous petrology
Mineralogy
Geochemistry